Jorge Varela is an environmentalist from Honduras. He received the Goldman Environmental Prize in 1999, for his contribution to marine conservation in the Gulf of Fonseca.

References

Year of birth missing (living people)
Living people
Honduran environmentalists
Goldman Environmental Prize awardees